Anathix puta, known generally as the puta sallow moth or poplar catkin moth, is a species of cutworm or dart moth in the family Noctuidae. It is found in North America.

The MONA or Hodges number for Anathix puta is 9962.

References

Further reading

 
 
 

Xylenini
Articles created by Qbugbot
Moths described in 1868